George Jones Sings is a compilation album released by George Jones in May 1957. The album didn't chart well; however, it plays many of his best early recordings.

The compilation was released in May 1957 when Starday Records was being absorbed by Mercury Records in 1957. It lists his first 6 Top 10 Country charters, including a collaboration with Jennette Hicks, and a rerecording of his very first recording from August 1956.

Background
14 Top Country Song Favorites was compiled from multiple recording sessions throughout 1955–1957. It also included songs that were previously listed on his earlier debut album. It includes Jones' very first charting track, "Why Baby Why" and a popular hit of Jones' from 1956 titled: "You Gotta Be My Baby." The album was produced by Jones' manager, and Starday Records co-founder, Pappy Daily, during a realignment of the top management jobs in Nashville, which would later result in the absorption of Starday to Mercury. During the exchange, multiple releases were made, and the label would print them as a Mercury-Starday printing.

Recording and composition
George Jones made his very first recording on January 19, 1954, with "No Money in This Deal."  This album's version was a rerecording made in August 1956. The first track was a #13 hit titled "Too Much Water" which Jones recorded on March 19, 1957, which was his very first session of Jones' held in Nashville. He later performed the song live on "The Tex Ritter Show."  "Why Baby Why" was recorded on August 27, 1955, and soon after release in September.  The song became Jones' first charting single. It would peak at #4 and remain his highest-charting single until the next year, when "Just One More," which would peak at #2 after release in September 1956. The song became one of Jones' greatest early hits, being covered by multiple artists since. "You Never Thought" was recorded in April 1957 and is the last track on the album to be recorded (ca. April 1957). "Take the Devil Out Of Me" was recorded in January 1957 alongside "Cup of Loneliness," which became his most well known gospel recording during the 1950s. "Ragged But Right" is one Jones' best known songs. Although it didn't chart, the song would become a live favorite and Jones would rerecorded it multiple times. This album's version of the song was his first rerecording of the track, from August 1956.  "All I Want to Do" was recorded in October 1956, and would later become the B-side to "Too Much Water" in April 1957.  Also in April 1957, the song "You Never Thought" was cut. Another song that appeared as a B-side to another track listed in this album was "Gonna Come Get You," released with "Just One More" in late 1956. Also during late 1956, one of Jones' biggest songs became "You Gotta Be My Baby," which Jones would perform live very often during the 1950s (including at his Grand Ole Opry debut in 1957).  It peaked at #7 soon after release in late June, 1956. "Uh, Uh, No" was the B-side to "Don't Stop the Music," recorded in October 1956, and released in January 1957.
Yearning (To Kiss You)
Jones would achieve great success recording duets with Tammy Wynette, but before this Jones recorded with Melba Montgomery and Margie Singleton in the early-mid 1960s. He collaborated with three different artists in the 1950s:  Sonny Burns in 1954, Jennette Hicks in 1956, and Virginia Spurlock in 1957.  In August 1956, he collaborated with his second artist, Jennette Hicks.  With her, Jones would record three songs, including his first charting collaboration single. Jones and Hick's song, "Yearning," peaked at #10 on the US Country chart.

Track listing
Jones would write or co-write all 14 tracks on this LP release.

1957 albums
George Jones albums
Mercury Records albums
Albums produced by Pappy Daily